Niall Woods is a retired Irish rugby footballer. He retired in 2001 having earned 8 caps on the wing for the Irish national team between 1994 and 1999 as well as playing for Blackrock Coll, Dublin University, Leinster, London Irish, Harlequins and Northern Suburbs.

References

Irish rugby union players
Ireland international rugby union players
Leinster Rugby players
London Irish players
Blackrock College RFC players
Dublin University Football Club players
Living people
1971 births
Ireland international rugby sevens players
People educated at Blackrock College
Rugby union wings